Katrin Käärt (married name Kubja; born 10 October 1983) is an Estonian athletics competitor.

She was born in Kohtla-Järve.

She began his athletics career in 1944, coached by his father. She is multiple-times Estonian champion in different athletics disciplines. 1998–2006 she was a member of Estonian national athletics team.

Her personal best in 400 m is 53,61 (2004).

References

Living people
1983 births
Estonian female sprinters
Sportspeople from Kohtla-Järve